The 2023 TCR UK Touring Car Championship is the sixth season of the TCR UK Touring Car Championship. The championship features production-based touring cars built to TCR specifications and will be held over fifteen races across seven meetings throughout England and Scotland. The championship is operated by Stewart Lines' Maximum Group in partnership with the British Racing and Sports Car Club

Calendar
The schedule for 2023 was announced on 10 October 2022 containing 15 races across 7 rounds. Snetterton would host the season opener and move onto the 300 circuit. Both Knockhill and Croft would return for the first time since 2018 and 2019 respectively. The championship would makes its first appearance on the traditional clockwise layout at Knockhill. The series would also return to Silverstone's National layout for the first time since the 2020 season. Both Donington Park and Oulton Park would slim down to a single meeting in 2023 while Castle Combe was left off the schedule altogether. It was also announced through social media that a media day would take place at Donington Park on the 29th March.

Changes

Organisational Changes
 In October 2022 it was revealed that the championship would be leaving the Time Attack UK package after 2 years to re-join the British Racing and Sports Car Club. As part of a multi-year agreement, TCR UK would appear as the headline event at 7 BRSCC race weekends. Furthermore, the BRSCC Fiesta Junior Championship was announced as an official feeder series to TCR UK and would race at the same events in 2023. 
 Former Ginetta Motorsport Manager Ashley Gallagher joined as Championship Manager for both TCR UK and the Milltek Sport Civic Cup.
 A total prize fund of £75,000 was announced by the organisers. At each meeting, cash prizes would be awarded to the pole position winner and the top 3 in each race. Moreover, the top 3 in the championship at seasons end would also receive prizes as well as the overall winners of the Goodyear Diamond Trophy and Tom Walker Memorial Trophy.

Technical Changes
 Carless Racing Fuels was introduced as the official control fuel supplier to the series. As part of this collaboration, a TCR Driver of the Day initiative was launched, with the winner receiving a 54 litre keg of control fuel.

Teams and drivers

Driver Changes 
 Entering/Re-Entering TCR UK 
 Both Gary Townsend and Joe Marshall-Birks will move from the Ginetta GT4 Supercup to join Paul Sheard Racing. They will also be joined by Ginetta GT5 Challenge racer Oliver Cottam.
 After an appearance in the previous seasons finale, George Jaxon will join the championship full time, driving a Cupra León Competición TCR for JW Bird Motorsport.
 Jenson Brickley joined the series driving a family run Cupra León Competición TCR.
 Lewis Brown moved from the Mini Challenge UK to join Chameleon Motorsport.
 Darron Lewis returned full time, having made a one-off appearance towards the end of the previous season.
 Former Kumho BMW Championship champion Rick Kerry announced a partial season campaign at the wheel of a Cupra León TCR.

 Changed Teams 
 Scott Sumpton moved from Essex & Kent Motorsport to join defending champion Chris Smiley at Restart Racing in a second Honda Civic Type R TCR (FK8).
 George Jaxon moved from Team HARD. with GO FIX to join JW Bird Motorsport.
 Alex Ley and Daniel James Motorsport joined forces with Area Motorsport.
 Having joined MPHR part way through the previous season, Steve Gales will commit to a full season alongside Brad Hutchinson in his first generation Audi RS 3 LMS TCR.
 Callum Newsham joined newcomers JH Racing and would drive a Hyundai i30 N TCR. 
 Jac Constable moved from Power Maxed Racing to join Rob Boston Racing.

Team Changes 
 Paul Sheard Racing will switch from running a Volkswagen Golf GTI TCR to the latest Gen II Audi RS 3 LMS TCR.
 Area Motorsport will enter a Hyundai Elantra N TCR for Jamie Tonks. This would be the first time this model would appear in the UK series. Bruce Winfield will also switch to Hyundai machinery ahead of the 2023 season.
 Chameleon Motorsport expanded and upgraded to the latest generation Cupra León Competición TCR.
 Daniel James Motorsport would collaborate with Area Motorsport and would run Alex Ley under the Area Motorsport with Daniel James banner.

References

External links
 

UK
TCR UK
TCR UK